Major General (MajGen) (Genmj) is a two-star commissioned officer rank in the Swedish Army, Swedish Air Force and Swedish Amphibious Corps. Major general ranks immediately above brigadier general and below a lieutenant general. The rank is equivalent to rear admiral in the Swedish Navy.

History
Historically, the major general assumed approximately the same position as a Chief of General Staff did in the latter part of the 19th century and the beginning of the 20th century. The major general was usually the commander of a brigade.

The rank of major general was between the rank of colonel and lieutenant general until 1972 when the senior colonel rank was introduced. Thereafter, major general was between the senior colonel and the lieutenant general from 1972 to 2000 when the brigadier general rank was introduced. Since 2000, major general has been between brigadier general and lieutenant general.

Following a proposal from the Swedish Armed Forces, the Government of Sweden decides on employment as a general of any rank.

In everyday speech, generals of all ranks are addressed as generals.

Rank insignia

Collar patches

Shoulder marks

Sleeve insignias

Amphibious Corps and Coastal Artillery

Air Force

Army

Hats

Personal flags
The command flag of a major general (and a rear admiral) is a double swallowtailed Swedish flag. In the first blue field 2 five-pointed white stars beside each other.

Footnotes

References

Notes

Print

Military ranks of the Swedish Army
Military ranks of the Swedish Air Force

sv:Generalmajor